Musa paracoccinea is a tropical and subtropical Asian  species of plant in the banana family native to both China (southeastern Yunnan province) and Indochina (northern Vietnam).  It is placed in section Callimusa (now including the former section Australimusa), members of which have a diploid chromosome number of 2n = 20.

References

paracoccinea
Flora of China
Flora of Indo-China
Plants described in 2002